Yaron Brown is a former Israeli football player and currently acts as the general manager of Hapoel Be'er Sheva.

Playing career
At the age of 16, Brown was promoted to Hapoel Petah Tikva's first team as a backup for Yitzhak Vissoker. He later played for Macacbi Netanya and Maccabi Haifa.

References

Year of birth missing (living people)
Living people
Israeli Jews
Israeli footballers
Hapoel Petah Tikva F.C. players
Maccabi Netanya F.C. players
Maccabi Haifa F.C. players
Hapoel Be'er Sheva F.C. players
University of Haifa alumni
Association football goalkeepers